SES-12 is a geostationary communications satellite operated by SES S.A.

Satellite description 
SES-12 was designed and manufactured by Airbus Defence and Space.

Launch 
SES-12 was successfully launched on a SpaceX Block 4 (booster B1040.2) Falcon 9 rocket from Cape Canaveral SLC-40 on 4 June 2018 at 04:45:00 UTC, and was successfully released into orbit approximately 33 minutes later.

Market 
The SES-12 satellite expands SES's capabilities to provide direct-to-home (DTH) broadcasting, Very-small-aperture terminal (VSAT), mobility, and High-Throughput Satellite (HTS) data connectivity services in the Asia-Pacific region, including rapidly growing markets such as India and Indonesia. The satellite replaces NSS-6 at this location and is co-located with SES-8. SES-12 is capable of supporting requirements in multiple verticals from Cyprus in the West to Japan in the East, and from Russia in the North to Australia in the South.

Together with SES-8, it reaches 18 million homes.

See also 

 SES S.A., owner and operator of SES-12
 List of SES satellites

References 

Communications satellites in geostationary orbit
SES satellites
Satellites of Luxembourg
Spacecraft launched in 2018
2018 in Luxembourg
SpaceX commercial payloads